Hillsborough Historic District is a national historic district located at Hillsborough, Orange County, North Carolina.  The district encompasses 529 contributing buildings, 9 contributing sites, 13 contributing structures, and 2 contributing objects in the central business district and surrounding residential sections of Hillsborough.   The district includes buildings dating to the late-18th and early-20th century and includes notable examples of Federal, Greek Revival, and Italianate style architecture. Located in the district are the separately listed Burwell School, Eagle Lodge, Hazel-Nash House, Heartsease, Montrose, Nash Law Office, Nash-Hooper House, Old Orange County Courthouse, Poplar Hill, Ruffin-Roulhac House, Sans Souci, and St. Matthew's Episcopal Church and Churchyard.  Other notable buildings include Seven Hearths, the Presbyterian Church (1815-1816), Methodist Church (1859-1860), First Baptist Church (1862-1870), Twin Chimneys, and the Berry Brick House.

It was listed on the National Register of Historic Places (NRHP) in 1973.

References

External links

Historic American Buildings Survey in North Carolina
Historic districts on the National Register of Historic Places in North Carolina
Federal architecture in North Carolina
Italianate architecture in North Carolina
Greek Revival architecture in North Carolina
Buildings and structures in Orange County, North Carolina
Hillsborough, North Carolina
National Register of Historic Places in Orange County, North Carolina
1701 establishments in North Carolina